Costume Quest 2 is a 2014 role-playing video game developed by Double Fine Productions and published by Midnight City. The sequel to Costume Quest (2010), Costume Quest 2 allows players to assume the identity of one of the two twin siblings, Wren or Reynold. Together with their friends, the group travels through the various in-game environments collecting candy and various costumes, in an attempt to thwart the plans of Dr. Orel White, who wishes to see Halloween banished forever. The game has an improved battle system and a time travel-based plotline. The downloadable-only title has been released on Microsoft Windows, OS X, Linux, PlayStation 3, PlayStation 4, Xbox 360, Xbox One, and Wii U.

Gameplay
Costume Quest 2 is a role-playing video game in which the player assumes the role of one of two twin siblings: Wren and Reynold. The game follows the player character, their sibling, and certain ally party members found along their travels as they journey through time in an effort to stop a dentist named Dr. Orel White from destroying Halloween. The player can access both the past and the future, where the past is before the foundation of the children's hometown, and the future takes place in a dental dystopia. As in Costume Quest, the gameplay mostly involves exploring the environment, completing quests, trick-or-treating, and fighting monsters in turn-based combat as gigantic versions of their costumed selves. The game introduces many new combat mechanics not found in the original Costume Quest, such as counters and double attacks.

Plot
Costume Quest 2 picks up where the DLC expansion of Costume Quest, "Grubbins on Ice", left off; Everett, Lucy, Wren, and Reynold are trapped inside a nexus of portals with no clear way out. They decide to jump into one of the portals, which prompts the player to choose which of the two siblings, Wren and Reynold, they wish to play as. After jumping in the portal, the kids return to Halloween night. There, they find their dentist, Dr. Orel White, speaking with a time wizard, who opens a portal to the past that Orel jumps into. As the wizard disappears, Wren and Reynold are confronted by a man hiding in a bush who opens another portal which leads to a future where Halloween has been outlawed and Orel rules a dental dystopia.

The man, who reveals himself to be an older Everett, along with his wife Lucy, task the kids with travelling to the past to reclaim a talisman with the ability to open a gateway to the monster world before Orel himself can steal it. In the past, they encounter a younger Orel White who stalls their progress. With the help of a boy named Monty, they eventually locate the talisman, but are unable to prevent future Orel from stealing it. They return to the future having failed their mission, where they are captured and sent to a school, where they find Everett and Lucy's daughter Hailey and must break out and confront Orel directly.

While in the future, the kids eventually encounter a retinal scanner which requires Orel to access. Travelling back to the past, the kids gain Orel as an ally, who, in the final battle against future Orel, denounces the actions of his future self and takes part in defeating him. Having changed the heart of younger Orel, the kids return to their present where Dr. White is now no longer evil.

Reception

Costume Quest 2 received lukewarm scores from reviewers, who stated that the game's new methods and abilities added more charm to the game than the original. In their review, IGN stated, "Costume Quest 2's combat and story are both surprisingly good for an RPG that concludes in roughly a half-dozen hours. Navigation is iffy, and the healing system is a bit broken even after a major revision, but its humor and personality shine through to make this a good Halloween bounty."

In 2014, Nintendo contacted Double Fine Productions, and were able to get the game released on the Nintendo Wii U. They were working together once again to try to get the game released through the Nintendo eShop, so consumers who owned a 3DS  would have a chance to play the game as well, though nothing ever came of this.

References

External links
Official website

2014 video games
Role-playing video games
Double Fine games
Halloween video games
IOS games
Linux games
MacOS games
PlayStation 3 games
PlayStation 4 games
PlayStation Network games
Xbox 360 games
Xbox 360 Live Arcade games
Xbox One games
Video games scored by Peter McConnell
Video games developed in the United States
Video games featuring female protagonists
Video game sequels
Wii U eShop games
Windows games
Single-player video games
Video games about time travel